In Japan,  was a title given to a regent who was named to act on behalf of either a child Emperor before his coming of age, or an empress regnant. The  was theoretically a sort of chief advisor for the Emperor, but was in practice the title of both first secretary and regent who assisted an adult Emperor. After the Heian period, shogunates took over the power.

A retired  was called , which came to commonly refer to Toyotomi Hideyoshi.

History
In earlier times, only members of the Imperial Family could be appointed . The  reports that Emperor Ōjin was assisted by his mother, Empress Jingū, but it is doubtful if it is a historical fact. The first historical  was Prince Shōtoku, who assisted Empress Suiko.

More precisely, those titles were held by the Fujiwara Hokke (northern Fujiwara family) and its descendants, to which Fujiwara no Yoshifusa belonged.

In 858, Fujiwara no Yoshifusa became . He was the first  not to be a member of the Imperial house.

In the 12th century, there were five families among the descendants of Yorimichi called : the Konoe family, Kujō family, Ichijō family, Takatsukasa family and Nijō family. Both the Konoe and Kujō families were descendants of Fujiwara no Yorimichi, through Fujiwara no Tadamichi. The other three families were derived from either the Konoe or Kujō families. Until the Meiji Restoration of 1868, those five families held those title exclusively with the two exceptions of Toyotomi Hideyoshi and his nephew Toyotomi Hidetsugu.

He was called .

List
The list is not exhaustive:

See also
 
  (written with the same characters as )

Citations

General references 
 
 .

 
Government of feudal Japan
Japanese historical terms
Japanese monarchy
Japanese nobility
Imperial Advisers
Lists of office-holders
Titles of national or ethnic leadership